is a Japanese voice actress affiliated with Sony Music Artists.

On July 11, 2022, Izawa tested positive for COVID-19.

Television animation

Amagi Brilliant Park (2014), Tomomi Terano; Preschooler
Locodol (2014), Satsuki Kashiba
Is It Wrong to Try to Pick Up Girls in a Dungeon? (2015), Goddess A
Hello! Kin-iro Mosaic (2015), Female Student B, Girl
Re-Kan! (2015), Hanako-san
To Love-Ru Darkness 2nd (2015), Girl
Valkyrie Drive: Mermaid (2015), Mamori Tokonome
Wakaba Girl (2015), Moeko Tokita
Age 12 (2016), Miko Onda, Anzu Yamada, Student, Clerk
Shōnen Maid (2016), Yu Nomura, Pet Owner
Gabriel Dropout (2017), Dog, Tanaka, Chappi
Kirakira PreCure a la Mode (2017), Girl
Anima Yell! (2018), Uki Sawatari
Assault Lily Bouquet (2020), Kaede Johan Nouvelle
Assault Lily Fruits (2021), Kaede Johan Nouvelle
Harem in the Labyrinth of Another World (2022), Rutina

Original video animation (OVA)

Amagi Brilliant Park (2015), Preschooler
Locodol Christmas Special (2015), Satsuki Kashiwaba

Film animation

Kuro no Sumika: Chronus (2014), Female Student
Grisaia: Phantom Trigger the Animation (2019), Shiori Arisaka

Dubbing

Pitch Perfect (2015), Kimmy Jin

Web radio

Izawa Mikako no honki! Anirabu (Chou! A&G+: October 2, 2012 - March 19, 2013)
Puchidopod (Neopod: June 4 - August 14, 2013)
Izawa Mikako Suwa Nanaka no Fuwa Sata (Chou! A&G+: July 11, 2015 - )
Wakaba Radio (D Anime Store: July 31, 2015 - )
Valkyrie Drive ~ Radio Mermaid (HiBiKi Radio Station: 2015 )
Nagaku Yuki Izawa Mikako no Boke TWO Office (Radiotomo: 2016 - 2017 )

Television program

Chōryūha (TV Tokyo: June 5, 2015 - ), Narrator

Video games
Azur Lane (2018), HMS Neptune

References

External links
 Official agency profile 
 

Japanese voice actresses
Living people
1994 births